Celso Brum Junior (born July 22, 1978 in Curitiba) is a retired volleyball player from Brazil. After playing professional volleyball for more than a decade, he ended his career due to injuries. He has a strong spike, knowing by his friends as "braço doido" (crazy army).

Celso is married and lives with his wife in the south of Brazil.

External links
 Profile

1978 births
Living people
Brazilian men's volleyball players
Sportspeople from Curitiba